17 Greatest Hits is a greatest hits album by the Puerto Rican singer Ricky Martin. It was released exclusively in the United Kingdom on July 11, 2011.

Greatest Hits was released one day before Ricky Martin's concert in London which was a part of his Música + Alma + Sexo World Tour. This compilation includes all of Martin's UK singles: "Livin' la Vida Loca" (number one for three weeks; platinum certification), "She Bangs" (number three; silver certification), "Nobody Wants to Be Lonely" (number four), "María" (number six), "Private Emotion" (number nine), "I Don't Care" (number eleven), "Shake Your Bon-Bon" (number twelve), "Loaded" (number nineteen) and "The Cup of Life" (number twenty-nine).

The album also includes "The Best Thing About Me Is You" which features English singer Joss Stone and "Más" (Wally Bilingual Remix). "The Best Thing About Me Is You" and album version of "Más" were originally included on Música + Alma + Sexo (2011). The album debuted at number twenty-four on the UK Albums Chart selling 5,083 copies.

Track listing

Charts

Release history

References

2011 greatest hits albums
Ricky Martin compilation albums
Spanish-language compilation albums
Columbia Records compilation albums
Albums produced by Walter Afanasieff
Albums produced by Desmond Child
Albums produced by Emilio Estefan
Albums produced by Javier Garza
Albums produced by George Noriega
Albums produced by K. C. Porter
Albums produced by Draco Rosa
Albums produced by Jon Secada
Albums produced by Scott Storch
Albums produced by Tommy Torres
Albums produced by will.i.am